Marreon Jamar Jackson (born October 29, 1998) is an American professional basketball player for the Fenerbahçe Koleji. He previously played for the Toledo Rockets and the Arizona State Sun Devils.

High school career
Jackson grew up in Cleveland, Ohio and initially played football before switching to basketball. He attended Garfield Heights High School alongside later Toledo teammate Willie Jackson. As a senior, Jackson averaged 23.2 points, seven assists and seven rebounds per game. He led Garfield Heights to a 22–5 record and the Division I regional championship, and he was named to the Cleveland.com First Team. Jackson committed to playing college basketball for Toledo in February 2016 over offers from Kent State, Cleveland State, Buffalo and Eastern Kentucky.

College career
Jackson began his college career with the Toledo Rockets. He averaged eight points per game as a freshman. He was named to the Mid-American Conference (MAC) All-Freshman Team. In April 2018, Jackson collapsed on the hardwood after running a drill and was rushed to the hospital, where he was diagnosed with a heart condition and permitted to continue playing basketball. As a sophomore, he averaged 11.7 points, 4.2 assists, and 1.4 steals per game and was named honorable mention all-conference. After the season, he had shoulder surgery. On February 25, 2020, he had a career-high 37 points in a 93–81 win against Central Michigan. Jackson averaged 19.8 points and 5.4 assists per game as a junior, both of which were second-highest in the MAC. He was named to the Second Team All-MAC. Following the season he declared for the 2020 NBA draft. On April 27, 2020, Jackson announced he was returning to Toledo, citing "unfinished business." As a senior, he averaged 18.1 points, 6.1 rebounds and 5.9 assists per game, earning MAC Player of the Year and First Team All-MAC honors. After the season, he transferred to Arizona State. On February 7, 2022, Jackson scored 16 points and surpassed the 2,000 point mark in a 91-79 loss to Arizona.

Professional career
On July 29, 2022, Jackson signed with the Fenerbahçe Koleji of the Turkish Basketball Second League.

Career statistics

College

|-
| style="text-align:left;"| 2017–18
| style="text-align:left;"| Toledo
| 33 || 32 || 29.7 || .405 || .422 || .750 || 2.9 || 2.7 || .8 || .1 || 8.0
|-
| style="text-align:left;"| 2018–19
| style="text-align:left;"| Toledo
| 32 || 31 || 29.2 || .428 || .359 || .772 || 3.9 || 4.2 || 1.4 || .1 || 11.7
|-
| style="text-align:left;"| 2019–20
| style="text-align:left;"| Toledo
| 32 || 32 || 35.3 || .409 || .369 || .816 || 4.3 || 5.4 || 1.5 || .0 || 19.8
|-
| style="text-align:left;"| 2020–21
| style="text-align:left;"| Toledo
| 30 || 30 || 34.2 || .403 || .348 || .904 || 6.1 || 5.9 || 1.8 || .3 || 18.1
|-
| style="text-align:left;"| 2021–22
| style="text-align:left;"| Arizona State
| 31 || 17 || 28.6 || .361 || .277 || .808 || 3.9 || 4.0 || 1.7 || .0 || 10.4
|- class="sortbottom"
| style="text-align:center;" colspan="2"| Career
| 158 || 142 || 31.4 || .402 || .354 || .822 || 4.2 || 4.4 || 1.4 || .1 || 13.5

Personal life
Jackson is the son of Lawanda and Herman Jackson. His older brother Marquis Jackson played basketball at Ohio Christian University. His second cousin Demario McCall is a cornerback at Ohio State.

References

External links
Arizona State Sun Devils bio
Toledo Rockets bio

1998 births
Living people
American men's basketball players
Arizona State Sun Devils men's basketball players
Basketball players from Cleveland
Point guards
Toledo Rockets men's basketball players